Frank Aloysius Barrett (November 10, 1892May 30, 1962) was an American soldier, lawyer and politician.  He served as a Republican member of the United States House of Representatives and the United States Senate, and as the 21st Governor of Wyoming.

Biography

Barrett was born in Omaha, Nebraska, to a family of eight. His parents were Patrick J. Barrett and Elizabeth A. Curran Barrett. His mother and his paternal grandparents emigrated to the United States from Ireland. He studied law and science at Creighton University, and worked as a postal employee at the same time.  During World War I, Barrett joined the Balloon Corps of the United States Army for a two-year enlistment. He married Alice Catherine Donoghue on May 21, 1919, and they moved to Lusk, Wyoming.

After arriving in Lusk, Barrett put his law degree to good use, acting as county attorney for Niobrara from 1922 until 1934.  He served in the Wyoming Senate from 1933 until 1935, then served on the Board of Trustees of the University of Wyoming. He first ran for Federal office in 1936, but lost out to Paul Greever.  He stood for Congress again in 1942, and won, serving there until 1950. In 1951, Barrett was sworn in as Governor. He resigned in 1953 after he was elected to the U.S. Senate in 1952, when he unseated three-term incumbent Joseph C. O'Mahoney. Barrett voted in favor of the Civil Rights Act of 1957. He was defeated after only one term by one of O'Mahoney's former aides, Gale McGee.

Family life
On February 17, 1956, his wife Alice died of cancer. They had had four children together, one of whom had died in infancy. On April 4, 1959, he remarried, to Augusta K. Hogan.  Barrett completed his term in the Senate in 1958, and narrowly lost his re-election bid.  In 1959 he was appointed Chief Counsel of the Department of Agriculture and sat on the board of directors of the Commodity Credit Corporation.  His son, James E. Barrett, was a senior judge of the United States Court of Appeals, Tenth Circuit and former judge of the United States Foreign Intelligence Surveillance Court of Review in Washington, D.C.

Death
Barrett was diagnosed with leukemia on May 15, 1962, and died just fifteen days later, at the age of 69.  He was interred at Lusk Cemetery in Lusk.  Barrett was a devout Catholic, and a member of the Knights of Columbus.

References

External links

Wyoming State Archives biography; accessed 2005-11-10.
"Frank Barrett Dies Memorial Day, Last Rites Saturday Morning at 10:00 in High School Auditorium", The Lusk Herald, May 1962.  Accessed 2005-11-10.
Congressional biography.  Accessed 2005-11-10.
HistoryBuff.com State Facts - Wyoming.  Accessed 2005-11-10.
The Political Graveyard
National Governors Association: Wyoming Governor Frank A. Barrett

1892 births
1962 deaths
20th-century American politicians
Politicians from Omaha, Nebraska
Deaths from leukemia
Republican Party governors of Wyoming
Republican Party Wyoming state senators
United States Army personnel of World War I
American people of Irish descent
Catholics from Nebraska
Catholics from Wyoming
Creighton University alumni
Creighton University School of Law alumni
Military personnel from Wyoming
United States Army soldiers
United States Department of Agriculture officials
Wyoming lawyers
Deaths from cancer in Wyoming
Republican Party United States senators from Wyoming
Republican Party members of the United States House of Representatives from Wyoming
People from Lusk, Wyoming
20th-century American lawyers